Mel Roberts may refer to:

Mel Roberts (baseball) (1943–2007), American baseball player and coach
Mel Roberts (photographer) (1923–2007), American photographer and filmmaker
Mel Roberts, see Wrexham (UK Parliament constituency)

See also
Melanie Roberts (disambiguation)